The Police, Public Order and Criminal Justice (Scotland) Act 2006 (asp 11) is an Act of the Scottish Parliament. It received Royal Assent on 1 April 2007.

References

Acts of the Scottish Parliament 2006